Lucas Martin (born February 22, 1968) is a retired American soccer forward.  Martin played three seasons in the Western Soccer Alliance and one in the American Professional Soccer League.  He also earned two caps with the U.S. national team.  He is now the co-owner and head chef of K&L Bistro in Sebastopol, California.

Youth
Martin spent his elementary school years in Sterling, Virginia. He learned to play soccer at a young age from his older brother Danny. Early in his soccer career Martin spent a lot of time playing and wanting to be a goalkeeper. Martin began playing travel soccer in the mid-1970s with the 1967 Sterling Blackhawks before the family moved to La Jolla in the late 1970s.  Martin attended La Jolla High School, graduating in 1986.  He then attended UCLA where he played on the men's soccer team from 1986 to 1988.  In 1986, he was named the team's offensive MVP.

Professional career
In 1986, while still at UCLA, Martin began playing with the San Diego Nomads of the Western Soccer Alliance.  He remained with the team through the 1990 season.  The Nomads won the 1987 WSA championship.  They repeated as champions in 1989.  In 1990, the WSA merged with the American Soccer League to form the American Professional Soccer League.  The Nomads failed to make the playoffs and withdrew form the league at the end of the season.  On July 15, 1994, Martin signed with the Sacramento Knights of the Continental Indoor Soccer League.  He finished the season with the Knights.

National team
Martin was selected for the U.S. squad which qualified for the 1987 FIFA U-20 World Championship.  The U.S. went 1–2 in group play and did not qualify for the second round.

The next year, Martin earned two caps with the U.S. national team in January 1988.  His first game was a 1–0 loss to Guatemala on January 10.  He came on for Kevin Grimes.  The second game was a 1–0 win over Guatemala three days later.

Culinary career
After retiring from playing professionally, Martin began a career as a chef.  He worked at Jardinière, Chapeau, the Rubicon and Hayes Street Grill, all top San Francisco restaurants.  While working at Hayes Street Grill, he met his wife, Karen.  In October 2001, they opened the K&L Bistro in Sebastopol, California where both serve as chefs.

References

1968 births
Living people
American chefs
American male chefs
American Professional Soccer League players
American soccer players
Continental Indoor Soccer League players
Parade High School All-Americans (boys' soccer)
Sacramento Knights players
Nomads Soccer Club players
Soccer players from Virginia
UCLA Bruins men's soccer players
United States men's international soccer players
Western Soccer Alliance players
United States men's under-20 international soccer players
People from Sterling, Virginia
Association football forwards